Catherine Marie Simone Tricot (5 February 1949 – 19 September 2018), known professionally as Catherine Castel, or Cathy Tricot, was a French actress and director.

Career
She was best known for appearing in films directed by Jean Rollin, alongside her twin sister Marie-Pierre Castel.  Catherine has appeared in several Rollin films with Marie-Pierre including his vampire classics The Nude Vampire and Lips of Blood and his erotic films Bacchanales Sexuelles and Hard Penetrations. She appeared in several other Rollin films, such as La comtesse Ixe, Sexual Vibrations and The Fiancée of Dracula (2002), final film.

Rollin originally wanted Castel to appear in his earlier films The Shiver of the Vampires and Requiem for a Vampire, but she became pregnant and the roles were offered to Marie-Pierre.

Other
She was a make-up artist for La comtesse Ixe and Phantasmes. She has been credited in films as "Cathy Tricot", "Catherine Tricot" and "Cathy Castel".

Filmography
 1969: La Vampire Nue (The Nude Vampire) - 'Georges' servant'
 1974: Tout le mondeil en a deux (Bacchanales Sexuelles) - 'Une souris'
 1975: Le Journal érotique d'un bûcheron (Erotic Diary) (later hardcore insert)
 1975: Lévres de Sang (Lips of Blood) - 'Jumelle Vampire'
 1975: Suce moi vampire (Suck Me Vampire) - 'Jumelle Vampire' (hard version of Lévres de Sang)
 1975: À bout de sexe - 'La vendeuse'
 1975: Les dépravées du plaisir (Le gibier)
 1975: Phantasmes (Once Upon a Virgin)
 1976: Introductions (Les weekends d'un couple pervers)
 1976: Douces pénétraitions (La Romancière lubrique) - 'Une soubrette'
 1976: La comtesse Ixe- 'Une invitée'
 1976: Amours collectives - 'Cathy'
 1976: Apothéose porno
 1977: Coctail porno
 1977: René la canne (Rene the Cane)
 1977: Hard Penetration
 1977: Vibrations Sexuelles (Sexual Vibrations)
 1977: Saute-moi dessus
 1977: Les queutardes
 1977: Désirs et perversions
 1982: Les Bachelières en chaleur (archive footage)
 1984: Les Débordements vicieux de Stella (archive footage)
 1989: Impudeur lesbiennes (direct-to-video)
 2002: La fiancée de Dracula (The Fiancee of Dracula) - 'Soeur à la corde à sauter'
 2007: La Nuit des horloges (archive footage)

References

External links
 

1949 births
2018 deaths
People from Villejuif
French film actresses
French film directors
Twin actresses
French twins
20th-century French actresses
French women film directors
French pornographic film actresses